"I'd Rather Miss You" is a song recorded by American country music group Little Texas. It was released in January 1993 as the fifth and final single from their debut album, First Time for Everything. It was co-written by the band's lead guitarist Porter Howell and rhythm guitarist Dwayne O'Brien. The song peaked at number 16 on the Billboards Hot Country Songs chart and reached number 13 on the Canadian RPM country Tracks chart in 1993.

Content
The song is a ballad in which the narrator states that he would rather be lonely and not have a significant other because the only one he wants to be with is his ex.

Music video
The music video was directed by Ken Ross and premiered in early 1993.

Chart performance
"I'd Rather Miss You" debuted at number 65 on the U.S. Billboard Hot Country Singles & Tracks for the week of January 30, 1993.

References

1993 singles
1992 songs
Little Texas (band) songs
Song recordings produced by James Stroud
Warner Records Nashville singles
Songs written by Dwayne O'Brien
Songs written by Porter Howell